Fine Paints of Europe, located in Woodstock, Vermont, U.S., is the sole North American importer of paints and varnishes manufactured in the Netherlands by Wijzonol Bouwverven B.V.

History
When founded in 1987, most of the company's products were destined for application in the restoration of historic properties. Today, the company's products are sold for commercial and residential application. The company also exclusively sold oil based paint until the late 1990s, when they introduced the Eurolux water-based acrylic latex line and the Eco hybrid enamel line. 

In 2013 John F. Lahey followed his father, the founder, as president of the company.

In recent years the company has developed and retailed premium paint palettes by the American designers Susan Sargent and Martha Stewart, and by Pantone. As sole licensee of Pantone Paints, the company offers a range of International color palettes including the Natural Color System, a 1,750 color palette developed by the Scandinavian Color Institute, and RAL, a color space system developed in 1927 by the Reichsausschuß für Lieferbedingungen und Gütesicherung (State Commission for Delivery Terms and Quality Assurance). The RAL color system has over 1,900 colors.

References
Butterfiled, Suzanne, and Jacqueline Goewey. Color Palettes. Clarkson Potter /Publishers: 1998. .
Lange, Bente. The Colours of Copenhagen. The Royal Danish Academy of Fine Arts School of Architecture Publishers: 1997. .

External links

Paint Analyzer Website
Scandinavian Color Institute Site
Brief History of Fine Paints of Europe

Woodstock, Vermont
Companies based in Vermont
Year of establishment missing
1987 establishments in Vermont
American companies established in 1987
Paint and coatings companies of the United States